Lewisham People Before Profit (LPBP) is a minor, left-wing political party based in the London Borough of Lewisham in the United Kingdom and established around 2008–2009. The party has stood for election outside Lewisham as People Before Profit.

The party campaigns against government cut-backs to local services, and for improved pay and conditions for working people. The party mainly contests elections to the borough council and mayoralty in Lewisham.

Leaders
The party's constitution stipulates that it has no leader and the title is chosen purely for the purposes of the Electoral Commission regulations. The current leader is Patricia Richardson.

History
LPBP candidates include Ray Woolford, who was previously a candidate for the Social Democratic Party, Liberal Democrats, and the Conservatives, as well as an independent candidate.

The party stood candidates in alliance with the Socialist Party of England and Wales for the 2010 local elections and the 2011 Bellingham ward by-election.

Elections

2012 Assembly Election
In May 2012, LPBP stood one candidate, Barbara Raymond, for the Greenwich and Lewisham constituency of the Greater London Assembly. Raymond polled 6,873 votes, 5.2% of the total, finishing fifth out of eight candidates.

2014 Lewisham Council and Mayoral Election
In May 2014, John Hamilton contested the election for the Mayor of Lewisham, despite LPBP's policy being that the post should be scrapped. He polled 6,014 first preference votes, or 8.3%. Hamilton came fifth out of seven candidates.

In the council election on the same day, 22 LPBP candidates stood for the 54 available seats, polling 12,957 votes in total out of 83,406, 15.5% of the total. LPBP's best result came in the Telegraph Hill ward where mayoral candidate John Hamilton polled 1,259 votes, to finish in fourth place in the contest for three seats.

2014 Rochester and Strood by-election
On 24 October 2014 it was confirmed that Nick Long of LPBP would contest the Rochester and Strood by-election on 20 November. Long finished in joint 7th place out of 13 candidates, polling 69 votes, less than 0.2% of the total. The election was won by the UKIP candidate, Mark Reckless.

2015 general election
LPBP contested two seats in the 2015 general election. In Lewisham East the party received 0.9% (6th place out of 7) while in Lewisham Deptford the party received 1.4% (6th place out of 10). Labour retained both seats with significantly increased majorities.

2021 Lewisham Council by-elections 
LPBP contested 3 of the 4 by-elections held alongside the 2021 local elections but didn't win any of the seats.

Notes

References

Political parties established in 2008
2008 establishments in the United Kingdom
Socialist parties in the United Kingdom
Politics of the London Borough of Lewisham
Organisations based in the London Borough of Lewisham
Locally based political parties in England